The Streets Were Not Paved With Gold: A Social History of Italians in Winnipeg is a 1993 non-fiction book by Stanislaò "Stan" Carbone, published by the Manitoba Italian Heritage Committee. It discusses the Italian-Canadian community in Winnipeg, Manitoba. The title refers to the mistaken belief that Canada was, in Carbone's words, "a land of gold", and that the immigrants there were wealthy. Carbone argues that Italian immigrants found it difficult to adjust to the capitalism found in Canadian society.

Contents
In "Emigration and Italian Society", Carbone describes the pre-immigration conditions and statuses of the Italians who moved to Winnipeg. J. E. Rea of the University of Manitoba Department of History stated that in addition to analyzing the reasons why Italians immigrated, the book also discusses demographic patterns and Italian Canadian entrepreneurial activities.

Reception
Rea described his own review of The Streets Were Not Paved With Gold as being "entirely negative"; Rea criticized the book having "not enough" information on the Italian community and the lack of development of certain details, such as the relationship between the Italian church in Winnipeg and the Roman Catholic Archdiocese of Winnipeg, possible issues caused by the small size of the Italian community, and information about Italian organizations.

References
 Rea, J. E. (University of Manitoba). "The streets were not paved with gold: a social history of Italians in Winnipeg // Review."  Canadian Ethnic Studies (Études Ethniques au Canada), 1995, Vol.27(1), p. 171.

Notes

1993 non-fiction books
History of Winnipeg
Italian emigrants to Canada
Non-fiction books about immigration
Books about immigration in Canada
European-Canadian culture in Manitoba
Italian-Canadian culture
Immigration to Manitoba